Sofia Essaïdi (born 6 August 1984) is a French-Moroccan singer and actress. She was born in Casablanca, to a Moroccan father, Lhabib Essaïdi, and a French mother, Martine Adeline Gardelle.

Career
From 30 August to 13 December 2003, she participated in the show Star Academy France'''s third season, becoming a semi-finalist. She eventually finished second to Elodie Frégé. 

From 12 March to 7 August 2004, she participated in the Star Academy tour, going to Morocco, and Papeete, Tahiti, where she celebrated her 20th birthday. She released her first album called Mon cabaret. Later, she starred in the musical  choreographed by Kamel Ouali which opened in "le Palais des Sports" in Paris on 29 January 2009. 

 Danse avec les starsIn 2011, She appeared in the first season of the French version of Dancing with the Stars. She placed as the runners up with her partner, Maxime Dereymez with 38% of the public votes.
This table shows the route of Sofia Essaïdi and Maxime Dereymez in Danse Avec Les Stars. In the final, the freestyle wasn't rated.

Discography

Album

Singles

Guest Vocals

2004 "Et si tu n'existais pas" (with Toto Cutugno)
2007 "Il n'y a plus d'après" (with Tomuya)
2010 "If" (As one of the artists of Collect If Aides 25 Ans)
2010 "La voix de l'enfant" (with Natasha St Pier & Bruno Solo)

Awards

 2009 – NRJ Music Awards : Francophone Group/Duo of the Year ( She was one of the artists who starred in the musical Cléopâtre)
 2010 – NRJ Music Awards : Francophone Female Artist of the Year
 2010 – Les jeunes talents de l'année: On 12 February 2010 she won Best Actress at Les jeunes talents de l'année'' 2009 (Young Talents of the Year 2009)

Filmography

Theatre

References

External links 

 
 Sofia Essaïdi on Discogs
 , Official website of Sofia Essaidi (in French)

1984 births
Living people
Moroccan emigrants to France
21st-century Moroccan women singers
People from Casablanca
Star Academy (France) participants
Paris Dauphine University alumni
French film actresses
French television actresses
21st-century French actresses
Moroccan film actresses
Moroccan television actresses
21st-century Moroccan actresses
21st-century French women singers